Betty Chung (born 1947) is a former Hong Kong recording artist and actress popular during the 1960s and 1970s. She sings in English and Mandarin.

Life and career
Betty Chung was born in Hong Kong.  Her ancestral hometown is Chengdu (成都市)，Sichuan Province. In 1963, she won a singing contest at the age of 16. She appeared in various TV commercials, TVB shows, and movies, including Enter the Dragon. Chung left Hong Kong showbiz in the 1980s. She married famous songwriter Chris Babida (Chinese: 鮑比達) but then divorced. She has one son and resides in California.

Filmography
1965: Xiao yun que
1968: Hong luan xing dong as Nightclub singer (Guest star)
1969: Diao jin gui
1969: Qing chun wan sui
1970: Huan le ren sheng
1970: Hen xin di ren
1973: She wang yu yan wang
1973: Enter the Dragon (龍爭虎鬥) as Mei Ling
1975: All Men Are Brothers (蕩寇誌) as Li Shih-shih (final film role)

Discography
1966： 《A Go Go》
1967： 《愛情鐘 Bell A Go Go》 
1967： 《假惺惺 Let's Pretend》
1968： 《紅鸞星動》OST
1968： 《I Want Action》
1968： 《迷你，迷你 Mini Mini》
1968： 《野火 Wild Flame》
1969： 《聖誕快樂 Merry Christmas》
1969： 《我祝福他 Massachusetts》
1969： 《桃李春風 Dark Semester》OST
1969： 《春火 My Son》OST 
1969： 《慾燄狂流 Torrent of Desire》OST 
1970： 《情感的債 One Day》
1970： 《浪子之歌 The Lark》
1970： 《蝴蝶飛 The Butterfly》
1970： 《迷你小姐 Mini-Midi-Maxi Girl》
1971： 《愛情故事 Love Story》
1974： 《Betty Chung》
1976： 《Peter Pan 小飛俠》Hong Kong version OST
1977： 《心有千千結》OST
1977： 《大家姐與大狂魔》電影原聲帶 (好市唱片)
2005： 《百代百年系列7：西洋風（一）大江東去》

TV appearances
 Enjoy Yourself Tonight 歡樂今宵 (TVB)
 1st Hong Kong Gold Disc Award Presentation 第一屆香港金唱片頒獎典禮 1977 (TVB)
 Miss Hong Kong Pageant 1977 (1977年度香港小姐競選) (TVB)
 Where Are They Now? (TVB) 2006 (TVB)

References

20th-century Hong Kong women singers
1947 births
Living people